Meall Garbh is a mountain on the north side of Glen Lyon in the Scottish Highlands. The flat summit of the hill has two tops of almost equal height, the north-west one being considered the higher.

Meall Garbh is usually climbed as part of a circuit of the watershed of the Invervar burn, a 14 kilometre route taking four Munros. If done clockwise Meall Garbh is the second summit reached, following Càrn Gorm. The following two summits are Càrn Mairg and Meall nan Aighean.

The summit cairn of Meall Garbh is unusual in that it is composed of old iron stake posts, rather than stones.

References 
 The Munros, Scotland's Highest Mountains, Cameron McNeish, 
Footnotes

Munros
Mountains and hills of the Southern Highlands
Mountains and hills of Perth and Kinross